"Un Poco Loco" is an Afro-Cuban jazz standard composed by American jazz pianist Bud Powell. It was first recorded for Blue Note Records by Powell, Curly Russell, and Max Roach on May 1, 1951.

Musical characteristics
"Un Poco Loco" is in thirty-two bar form. On the original recording, improvisation was based on a single scale instead of a chord sequence.

Legacy
In the late 1980s, the renowned literary and cultural critic Harold Bloom included "Un Poco Loco" in his list of the most "sublime" works of twentieth-century American art (from his introduction to Modern Critical Interpretations: Thomas Pynchon's Gravity's Rainbow).

References

1951 songs
Jazz compositions
Compositions by Bud Powell